Fran is a 1985 Australian film directed by Glenda Hambly, with Noni Hazlehurst in the title role. Fran is a mother who abandons her children in favour of a romantic life after her husband leaves her. It was filmed in Perth, Western Australia, Australia.

Awards
Fran was nominated for an AFI Awards in three categories (Best Actress in a Supporting Role, Best Director, Best Film). It won AFI Awards in the Best Actress in a Lead Role (Noni Hazlehurst), Best Actress in a Supporting Role (Annie Byron) and Best Original Screenplay (Glenda Hambly) categories.

Cast
Noni Hazlehurst as Fran
Annie Byron as Marge
Alan Fletcher as Jeff
Narelle Simpson as Lisa
Travis Ward as Tom
Rosie Logie as Cynthia
Danny Adcock as Ray
Steve Jodrell as Michael Butlin
Penny Brown as Sally Aspinal
Faith Clayton as Waigani Supervisor

Production
Glenda Hambly was commissioned by the Western Australia Department for Community Services to make a film about the problems of a single mother and she convinced them to let her make it as a drama. The producers pre-sold the movie to Channel Seven and it was made as a telemovie but was released theatrically.

Box office
Fran grossed $111,903 at the box office in Australia.

See also
 Cinema of Australia

References

Further reading

External links

1985 films
1985 drama films
Australian drama films
1980s English-language films
1980s Australian films